The Circuito Mexicano de Básquetbol, also known with the acronym CIMEBA, was a professional basketball league in Mexico. The first edition was the 1970–71 season, and it continued until the 2006–07 season, after which the league was discontinued. The league coexisted with the Liga Nacional de Baloncesto Profesional (LNBP) from 2000 to 2007, and with the Circuito de Baloncesto de la Costa del Pacífico (CIBACOPA) from 2001 to 2007.

History 
CIMEBA was founded in 1970, with the first season being played between 1970 and 1971. The league held an annual All-Star Game. In November 1999 a selection of CIMEBA players named "CIMEBA All-Stars" toured the United States and played games against NCAA Division I college teams such as Illinois, Michigan State, Minnesota, Ohio, and Purdue. 

In the late 1990s and the early 2000s, CIMEBA rules established a maximum number of 3 foreign players per team. In the early 2000s the league also organized another tournament, Conferencia de Básquetbol de Desarrollo CIMEBA (CIMEBA Development Basketball Conference), also known as COBADE, which was played at the same time as CIMEBA. 

CIMEBA was the main basketball league in Mexico until the creation of the LNBP (2000) and the CIBACOPA (2001).
In the early 2000s the league experienced financial difficulties. Some of the teams left for the LNBP, while others retired mid-season. The last edition was the 2006–07 season, won by Guerreros de Chilpancingo. The last CIMEBA president was Agustín Villa.

List of champions

Championships

References

External links 

Basketball leagues in Mexico
1970 establishments in Mexico
Sports leagues established in 1970
2007 disestablishments in Mexico
Sports leagues disestablished in 2007